Brian Ford (OBE, born 1940, Nottingham)  is a British Mathematician who founded, and until his retirement in 2004, was director of the Numerical Algorithms Group (NAG). Ford gained a Ph.D. in Applied Mathematics from the University of Nottingham. The NAG (then Nottingham Algorithms Group) project began in 1970 as a collaborative venture, led by Ford, between the Universities of Birmingham, Leeds, Manchester, Nottingham and Oxford, and the Atlas Computer Laboratory. In 1973 the project moved to Oxford and was renamed. Ford was awarded an Order of the British Empire in 1989 in "recognition of outstanding services to British industry and research" In 2005 he was awarded an Honorary Degree from the University of Bath.

References

External links
Citation for honorary degree at Bath

20th-century British mathematicians
21st-century British mathematicians
Living people
Academics of the University of Nottingham
Numerical analysts
Officers of the Order of the British Empire
Year of birth missing (living people)